José Cobos may refer to:

 José Cobos (footballer) (born 1968), French footballer
 José Cobos (baseball) (born 1980), Mexican baseball pitcher
 José Cobos Benítez (born 1963), Spanish wheelchair basketball player